Mangelia hyemalis is a species of sea snail, a marine gastropod mollusk in the family Mangeliidae.

Description
The length of the shell attains 30 mm.

The shell has a fusiform shape. It is slightly translucent but still solid. The spire has an elongated conical shape. The protoconch is papillar, white and shining. The shell contains 9 whorls. They are slightly impressed towards the suture. They are at first smooth but then become obliquely costulate and rugose. The narrow aperture has an elongated oval shape with on top a large and deep sinus. The siphonal canal is very short and wide open. The columella is slightly arcuate and is thickened at its base.

Distribution
This marine species occurs off Tierra del Fuego.

References

External links
 
  Tucker, J.K. 2004 Catalog of recent and fossil turrids (Mollusca: Gastropoda). Zootaxa 682:1–1295.
 MNHN, Paris: syntype

hyemalis
Gastropods described in 1888